Gregory of Durrës (Gregory of Dyrrachium) (or Gregory the Printer) (c. 1701–1772) was a scholar, printer, typographer, and teacher, and an Eastern Orthodox Christian monk and cleric who is thought to have invented a particular Albanian alphabetic script, the Elbasan script, used to write the Elbasan Gospel Manuscript. The manuscript is one of the oldest known pieces of Albanian Orthodox literature, as well as the oldest known Orthodox Bible translation into Albanian.

Life
Gregory was born around the end of the 17th century. He was of Greek descent. He is firstly mentioned in 1720 when he is noted to have met a Serbian illuminist in Ottoman Berat. Gregory is reported to have been a student of the Aromanian philosopher Ioannis Chalkeus, a significant figure in the Greek Enlightenment. Before moving to Voskopojë, he worked as a teacher in Berat.

Academic career
As a budding scholar, Gregory first arrived in Voskopoja some time before 1730, according to historical author Robert Elsie.  At least in 1744 Gregory is mentioned as a teacher at the New Academy of Moscopole. Before 1731 he became a monk, during which time he most probably learned the art of printing. It is not proven where he did his training for printing, though the Venetian printmaker Nikolaos Glykys in Venice is sometimes mentioned in this regard.

Career in printing
Around 1730 Gregory founded the Moscopole printing house. The printing equipment were brought from Venice. In the printing establishment of Voskopoja are known at least 14 acolytes published, mostly portraying local saints, used for liturgical purposes. In general there are 20 different publications having the name of Moscopole printed in them between 1731 and 1760. An edition from 1769, though considered by most scholars to be from Moscopole, it lack the name of the city, thus can not be attributed with certainty. Gregory oversaw the printing press at the earliest until 1744, as can be seen from his name on the colophons. After this date his name does not appear in any Moscopole publications. The last work printed at the Moscopole workshop is a school grammar from Theodore Kavalliotis.

After 1744, Gregory is thought to have taken up residence at Saint Gjon Vladimir's Church, Elbasan.  Gregory was the first to translate the Old and New Testament into Albanian, using an original alphabet he had invented sometime around 1761. After moving to Elbasan, he might have introduced the famous Elbasan Gospel Manuscript in 1761. His presence in Elbasan is not supported by documentary evidence.

Later life and death
According to Dhimitër Shuteriqi, around 1748 he became Archbishop of the Archbishopric of Durrës for the first time. At least in 1761 this position was held by a different orthodox leader. Only afer the abolition of the Ohrid Patriarchate in 1768, Gregory was reappointed by the Ecumenical Patriarchate of Constantinople as Metropolitan of Durrës. Later in life, Gregory donated books to the local library, which was most probably destroyed in 1769 when Voskopoja was sacked.  

His last signature was 1772 as Metropolitan of Durrës, most probably in Shen Gjon Vladimir, Shijon in Elbasan. This is the year when he is considered to have died.

Two Gregories hypothesis
In 1932 Bulgarian historian Ivan Snegarov was one of the first to propose the idea of two different Gregories living and working in Moscopole at the same time from 1731 to 1744. According to him, one of them known as Gregory the Printer was responsible for printing while the other know as Gregory from Moscopole was a corrector and writer. This idea was perpetuated further by the Albanian scholar Dhimitër Shuteriqi, who continued the idea throughout his work. His most important article on the topic was written in 1987 where a full biography of Gregory is attempted. More recently, Canadian born Albanologist Robert Elsie, following mostly on Shuteriqis footsteps also considered that Gregory of Durrës, and Gregory the Printer were two different people. The missunderstanding seems to have emerged from Moscopolean books themselves, where Gregory is signed by different names. According to Maximilian Peyfuss, in his books Gregory is signed in no less that seven forms: Gregory the Printer; Gregory of Moscopole; Gregory Konstantinis; Gregory Konstantinidis; Gregory the Printer of Moscopole; Gregoρy Ieromonachos; and, Gregory Ierodaskalos. Coming from such a rich variety of signatures, Gregory "takes so many different names, that certain diferences between them should not shed doubt on his identity." 

Early authors such as Eulogios Kourilas and Mahir Domi did not accept the two Gregories hypothesis, continuing the idea of Gregory being one and the same, a printer, ieromonach, and teacher. An idea strongly defended by Peyfuss as well with his arguments. More recently new evidence seems to debase further the two Gregories hypothesis. In The Rhetoric of Theophilos Corydalleus printed in Moscopole in 1744 Gregory wrote a certain "appendix on time" which he signed as "Gregory of Moscopole the Printer". The same book was riprinted in Halle in 1768, while Gregory was still alive, and there the signature was changed to "Gregory of Durrës". This seems to be a clear evidence pointing to one and the same Gregory. Furthermore, an engraving of his portrait from 1742 (see above) has his name written as "the Ieromonach Gregory of Moscopole and Printer", revealing all of his occupancies, and proving this identity.

Works 
Gregory published his first work, "Life of Saint Nikodemos" in 1741, and in 1744 he was chosen as deputy rector of the New Academy.  Other original works include:

Akoluthia of Saint Theodora (1731)
Akoluthia of St. Harallamb (1734)
Akoluthia of Saint Seraphim (1735)
Akoluthia of St. Naum (1740)
Akoluthia of the Fifteen Martyrs (1741)
Akoluthia of St. Clement (1741)
Akoluthia of St. John Vladimir (1742)
Akoluthia of the Seven Saints (1742)
Pastoral Letter of Patriarch Joasaf of Ohrid (1742)
Akoluthia of Saint Vision (1744)
The Rhetoric of Theophilos Corydalleus (1744)
Akoluthia of Saint Anthony (1746)
Catechism (1746)
Leonardo Lombardi [1749]
Oktaikos (1750)
Grammar by Kavalliotis (1760)

Notes

See also 
 Theodhor Haxhifilipi
 Albanian alphabet

References

Citations

Bibliography

Eastern Orthodoxy in Albania
Eastern Orthodox Christians from Albania
18th-century Albanian people
Creators of writing systems
Albanian non-fiction writers
1700 births
Albanian clergy
Typography